Šekovići is a town and municipality located in northeastern Republika Srpska, an entity of Bosnia and Herzegovina. As of 2013, it has a population of 6,761 inhabitants, while the town of Šekovići has a population of 1,519 inhabitants.

History
From the Roman period to the present day major roads were cutting through the Šekovići region. These roads connected regions East of Drina River with Central Bosnia. Šekovići got its name by one portion of its inhabitants from Šekovina in Herzegovina, who immigrated to this region at the end of the 17th century. Until the end of the 17th century Šekovići was a well-inhabited area, till army invasions and different diseases decreased the population of Šekovići and almost wiped out the first people living there. Soon after that the new inhabitants from Herzegovina settled in Šekovići and they make up most of today’s populations. One of the first settlers beginning XVII left Šekovići, Ilija Birčanin, Hadži Milentije and Prote Matije Nenadović. Because of the family and other ties through the monastery this region had strong military cooperation with Serbia during the First Serbian Uprising. Ivan Groznog's mother Jelica Jakšić Glinska is from Šekovići and because of the Monastery Papraća and Russian Czar Palace had a good relationship. Monastery Lovnica and Papraca in the past were significant cultural and freedom centers. From the 16th century these two monasteries had ties with Russia, and monasteries in Serbia, Poland and Vlachs. Šekovići have special places in NOB (Serbian: Narodno Oslobodilacka Borba, English:Peoples Freedom Fight), they belong to one of the first uprising regions in Yugoslavia. In Šekovići were formed the Prva Bircanslka Brigada (First Birac Brigate), Sesta Istocnobosanska Brigada (Sixst Estern Bosnian Brigate) and Prva Pionirska Divizija ( First Pionir Division). In 1943, Sekovici was the military, political and cultural center for eastern Bosnia, according to author Rudi Petovara. Inside of it was the highest military and political leadership for Eastern Bosnia.

Demographics

Population

Ethnic composition

Economy
The following table gives a preview of total number of registered people employed in legal entities per their core activity (as of 2018):

See also
 Municipalities of Republika Srpska

References

External links

 Official website in Serbian

Populated places in Šekovići
Cities and towns in Republika Srpska
Šekovići